Discosoridae comprise a family of endogastric discosorids, (Cephalopoda, Nautiloidea), with endocones in the siphuncle, ranging from the Middle Silurian to Middle Devonian.

Shell morphology
The shell in the Discosoridae is conical, expanding variably with respect to genus. Curvature tends to be slight with the ventral or siphuncular side slightly  concave in profile (the endogastric condition), and the opposite dorsal side arched or convex in profile (another endogastric condition).

The siphuncle is composed of broadly rounded segments the increase rapidly in size toward the aperture, with growth.  Expansion is commonly greater than that of the shell itself, and lies ventral of the center. Septal necks are short, brims long and recumbent. Connecting rings are thin and poorly known.  Bullettes at the apical end of the connecting rings, which grasp the periphery of the previous septal foramina and connect to the inside of the previous septal necks, are never swollen.

Endocones are formed by overlapping   parietal deposits that line in inner side of the siphuncle in the apical part of the shell. The internal contour is wavy, in contrast to the straight conical contours of the endocerid endocones, following the general configuration of the siphuncle.  The narrow endosiphotube, left within the adapical  portion, may contain diaphragms.

Complete  shells are rare.  Most of the information regarding comes from isolated siphuncles

Origin
The Discosoridae are thought to be derived from the Lowoceratidae, a small family of variably exograstric discosorids, probably from Lowoceras the straighter of the two.

Genera
Genera belonging to the Discosoridae include:
Discosorus, type
Alpeboceras
Endodiscosorus
Kayoceras
Stokesovers
 and possibly Konglungenoceras unless Cyrtogomphoceratidae.

References

 Flower, R.H.and Curt Teichert 1957. The Cephalopod Order Discosorida. University of Kansas Paleontological Contributions, Mollusca, Article 6. July 1957
 Teichert, C 1964. Nautiloidea -Discosorida. Treatise on Invertebrate Paleontology Part K.  Geological Soc of America and Univ. Kansas Press

Discosorida
Silurian animals
Devonian animals
Silurian first appearances
Middle Devonian extinctions
Prehistoric nautiloid families